J. H. "Red" Winn (1896 – unknown) was a professional poker player in the early days of poker. He was considered an "all-around great poker player". Winn was an original inductee into the Poker Hall of Fame in 1979.

Notes

Winn, Red
1896 births
Year of death missing
Poker Hall of Fame inductees